Patrick Rafter defeated the defending champion Pete Sampras in the final, 1–6, 7–6(7–2), 6–4 to win the singles tennis title at the 1998 Cincinnati Masters.

Seeds 
The top eight seeds received a bye to the second round.

Draw

Finals

Top half

Section 1

Section 2

Bottom half

Section 3

Section 4

References 

Singles